Provincial elections are scheduled to be held in the Pakistani province of Punjab on 30 April 2023 to elect a new provincial legislature.

Electoral system 
The 371 seats of the Punjab Assembly consist of 297 general seats, whose members are elected by the first-past-the-post voting system through single-member constituencies. 66 seats are reserved for women and 8 seats are reserved for non-Muslims. The members on these seats are elected through proportional representation based on the total number of general seats secured by each political party.

Background 
In the 2018 election, the Pakistan Tehreek-e-Insaf (PTI) emerged as the largest party in the Provincial Assembly of Punjab after 25 independents joined it. However, the PTI was still 2 seats short of a majority. After the Pakistan Muslim League (Q) (PML(Q)) agreed to support the PTI, they formed a coalition government in the province. The Pakistan Muslim League (N) (PML(N)) emerged as the second largest party and formed the opposition.

During a political crisis in Pakistan after the successful no-confidence motion against Prime Minister Imran Khan, another motion of no confidence was filed against Chief Minister Usman Buzdar, as well as against Chaudhry Pervaiz Elahi and Dost Muhammad Mazari, the Speaker and Deputy Speaker of the Provincial Assembly, respectively. Buzdar resigned before a vote on the motion of no confidence could be held and as a consequence, an election for a new Chief Minister was scheduled on 16 April between PML(N)'s Hamza Shahbaz, the joint candidate of the Pakistan Democratic Movement (PDM), and PML(Q)'s Chaudhry Pervaiz Elahi, the joint candidate of his party and PTI. On the day of the election, 25 PTI MPAs crossed the floor to support Shahbaz, violating party policy. During the very beginning of the Assembly session on 16 April, a riot began between PTI and PML-N supporters. PTI MPAs threw ewers at the Deputy Speaker, as well as slapping him. The police entered the Assembly for the first time in its history and arrested 3 MPAs. The Deputy Speaker then presided over the Assembly session in the visitors gallery and declared Shahbaz the winner by securing 197 votes.

After the floor crossing, the Election Commission of Pakistan (ECP) de-seated 25 dissident PTI MPAs for defection in the light of Article 63-A of the Constitution of the Islamic Republic of Pakistan on 20 May 2022. Five of these MPAs were elected on reserved seats (3 for women and 2 for minorities) and new PTI MPAs were notified on these seats on 7 July.

By-elections were held on 17 July 2022 to elect the remaining 20 members. The PTI won in a landslide, emerging victorious on 15 of those 20 seats, leading to the collapse of Chief Minister Hamza Shahbaz's PML-N led coalition government, as their coalition became 7 seats short of a majority. Elahi took oath as the Chief Minister of Punjab on 27 July 2022, leading a PTI-PML(Q) coalition government.

On 12 January 2023, after winning a vote of confidence the night before, Elahi sent a letter to Governor Baligh Ur Rehman, advising him to dissolve the Provincial Assembly. Rehman excused himself from the dissolution process and after 48 hours, the Assembly automatically stood dissolved. Elections must be conducted within 90 days of the dissolution, meaning by or before 14 April 2023.

On 22 January 2023, Mohsin Raza Naqvi took oath as the caretaker Chief Minister of Punjab. He was nominated by the Election Commission of Pakistan (ECP) after days of deadlock between the government and the opposition over who to nominate.

On 10 February 2023, after weeks of no announcement of an election date, the Lahore High Court (LHC) ordered the ECP to immediately announce the date for the elections to "ensure that [they] are held not later than ninety days as per the mandate of the Constitution".

On 20 February 2023, the ECP had still not announced the date for the election. Therefore, President Arif Alvi decided to unilaterally appoint 9 April 2023 as the election date.

On 1 March 2023, in a 3-2 split verdict, the Supreme Court ruled that President Alvi's order of appointing an election date was "constitutionally competent", as the Assembly was dissolved without the order of Governor Rehman. However, the verdict further stated that due to the delays in the announcement of the election date, 9 April may not be a feasible election date. Therefore, the ECP was ordered to immediately propose a date with the "minimum possible delay" to the President and after consultation, the latter shall announce a date for the election.

As a result of the verdict, on 3 March 2023, the ECP had suggested the dates of 30 April to 7 May to President Alvi and on the same day, the latter announced that the provincial election will be held on 30 April 2023.

Campaign

Pakistan Tehreek-e-Insaf

Joining of former PML(Q) MPAs 
A day after the Assembly was dissolved, the Pakistan Muslim League (Q) (PML(Q)) Punjab president and outgoing Chief Minister, Chaudhry Pervaiz Elahi, hinted at a possible merger of the PML(Q) with the Pakistan Tehreek-e-Insaf (PTI). As a consequence, the president of the PML(Q) and former Prime Minister, Chaudhry Shujaat Hussain, who is also Elahi's cousin, issued him a show-cause notice and suspended his party membership. On the other hand, the office-bearers of the PML(Q)'s electoral college authorized Elahi to take decisions on behalf of the party, in regards to the potential merger.

On 21 February 2023, after failing in his attempts to merge the PML(Q) with the PTI, Elahi, along with all other nine former PML(Q) MPAs, joined the PTI.

General campaign 
The PTI announced that it would start its election campaign on 8 March 2023. Imran Khan, the former Prime Minister and the Chairman of the PTI, stated that party workers will start arranging corner meetings and rallies across all districts of Punjab. Khan also said that he will suggest solutions to problems caused by the incumbent PDM-led federal government.

On 8 March 2023, the PTI attempted to start its campaign by taking out a rally from Khan's residence at Zaman Park to Data Darbar. However, just prior to the start of the rally, a ban on public gatherings was imposed in the provincial capital of Lahore and dozens were taken into police custody for violating the ban. Due to the increased violence, Khan called off the rally. One PTI worker, Ali Bilal, also lost his life in the violence, with Khan claiming the Punjab police had murdered Bilal.

On 12 March 2023, Khan once more announced to hold a rally in Lahore but a ban on public gatherings by the PTI was again imposed in the city. The PTI was finally allowed to hold the rally on 13 March 2023 starting from Khan's residence at Zaman Park to Data Darbar. Moreover, in his address to thousands of party workers and rally attendees, Khan announced that the party would hold a grand "power show" at the Minar-e-Pakistan on 19 March.

On 19 March, Khan announced that he would be postponing the Minar-e-Pakistan "power show" to 22 March. On the same day, the Pakistan Muslim League (Z), a minor political party based in Bahawalnagar, was merged into the PTI by its president, Ijaz-ul-Haq, the son of the  former President of Pakistan Zia-Ul-Haq.

Opinion polls 
In the run up to the 2023 Pakistani general elections, various organizations have been carrying out opinion polling to gauge voting intention throughout Pakistan and the approval rating of the civilian Pakistani government, led by Imran Khan's Pakistan Tehreek-e-Insaf. The results of such polls are displayed in this section. The date range for these opinion polls are from the previous general election, held on 25 July 2018, to the present day.

Punjab Assembly Voting intention 
The results in the tables below (excluding the column on undecided voters and non-voters) exclude survey participants who said they wouldn't vote or they didn't know who they would vote for and add up to 100%. In polls that include undecided voters or non-voters, percentages are adjusted upwards in order to make the total equal 100%. Margins of error are also adjusted upwards at the same rate to account for the increase.

Results

Result by Party

Results by division

Results by district

Results by constituency

See also 

 2023 Khyber Pakhtunkhwa provincial election

Notes

References

2020s elections in Pakistan
Elections in Punjab, Pakistan
2023 elections in Pakistan
Punjab